The 2012–13 season saw Società Sportiva Calcio Napoli compete in Serie A, UEFA Europa League and Coppa Italia. In December 2012, Napoli were docked two points for two of their players not reporting plans to fix matches in 2010. About a month later, however, Napoli won their appeal against the ban and the punishments were overturned.

Players

Squad information

Competitions

Supercoppa Italiana

Serie A

League table

Results summary

Results by round

Matches

Coppa Italia

UEFA Europa League

Group stage

Knockout phase

Round of 32

Statistics

Appearances and goals

|-
! colspan="20" style="background:#dcdcdc; text-align:center"| Goalkeepers

|-
! colspan="20" style="background:#dcdcdc; text-align:center"| Defenders

|-
! colspan="20" style="background:#dcdcdc; text-align:center"| Midfielders

|-
! colspan="20" style="background:#dcdcdc; text-align:center"| Forwards

|-
! colspan="20" style="background:#dcdcdc; text-align:center"| Players transferred out during the season

Goalscorers

Last updated: 19 May 2013

References

S.S.C. Napoli seasons
Napoli